Valentin Ivanovich Rassadin (November 12, 1939 – August 15, 2017) was a Soviet and Russian linguist. He is best known for his documentation and studies of the Tofa language and Soyot-Tsaatan language.

Biography 
Rassadin was born in Pskov, Soviet Union on November 12, 1939 into an Izhorian family. He spent much of his childhood with his Izhorian grandmother, from whom he learned Izhorian songs and some of the Izhorian language. The Nazi German army occupied Pskov in 1941, and in 1943 Rassadin and his mother were sent to a labor camp in Lithuania. After the war, Rassadin's family moved throughout the Soviet Union with his father's military career. During these travels he learned some Tatar from a classmate and became interested in the similarities between the languages he had learned. He graduated high school in 1957 in Kholmsk, Sakhalin.

In 1957 he entered Leningrad State University's Oriental Faculty to study Mongolian philology. He received permission to attend lectures in Turkic philology and studied the Old Turkic language. He graduated in 1962. After graduating he worked as a Mongolian translator for the Soviet Ministry of Construction in the Mongolian city of Darkhan.

Rassadin returned to higher education in 1963 at Novosibirsk State University where he studied Turkic languages. From 1964 to 1976 Rassadin went on a number of expeditions to study the Tofa people and their language. During this time he lived among the Tofa and worked alongside them. There he studied the Tofa language, and in 1967 he defended his dissertation on the vocabulary of the Tofa language.

Rassadin worked at the Siberian Branch of the Russian Academy of Sciences from 1966–2006. From 1992–2006 he served part-time as the chair of the Department of Central Asian philology at Buryat State University. From 2006 onward he served as the director of the Scientific Center for Mongolian and Altaic Studies at Kalmyk State University, while also teaching in the departments of Kalmyk language and Mongolian studies.

Rassadin died on August 15, 2017. The Head of the Republic of Buryatia and the People's Khural expressed their condolences.

Research 
Rassadin's research focused primarily on the Tofa and Soyot languages, but he wrote extensively on the Buryat language and other languages of southern Siberia.

Rassadin is credited with helping to preserve the moribund Tofa language. In 1989 he created a Cyrillic alphabet for Tofa and promoted the teaching of Tofa in schools. He attempted to do the same for Soyot, publishing dictionaries and grammars. He was one of the few people to have studied the Tuha language, a nearly-extinct language related to both Tofa and Soyot spoken in Tsagaan-Üür, Khövsgöl, Mongolia.

Selected publications

Awards and honors 
 1980. Honored scientist of the Buryat ASSR
 1988. Corresponding member of the Finno-Ugrian Society
 1990. Honored scientist of the RSFSR
 1999. Silver Sigma award of the Siberian Branch of the Russian Academy of Sciences
 2001. Order of Friendship
 2005. First recipient of the "Recognition" award of Buryatia, along with a diploma and a gold "Aldar solo" medal
 2008. Member of the Russian Committee of Turkologists
 2009. "Civil Valor" award from the Sakha Republic
 2009. Honorary professor of
 2014. Mongolian Order of the Polar Star
 2014. Honored professor of Buryat State University
 2014. Honorary doctor of the Institute of Mongolian, Buddhist, and Tibetan Studies of the Siberian Branch of the Russian Academy of Sciences

Bibliography

References 

Russian Turkologists
Linguists from Russia
1939 births
2017 deaths